Diallo Vincent Rabain, JP, MP is the current Minister of Education and Workforce Development, and a member of the Bermuda Progressive Labour Party.

Political life 
Rabain was appointed to the Senate in November 2011 by the then Premier of Bermuda, Paula Cox. He served as the Junior Minister of Education and the Junior Minister of Youth, Families and Sports. In 2012 he was unsuccessful as a candidate for election to the House of Assembly in Bermuda.  In December 2012, he was reappointed to the Senate as the Opposition Leader in the Senate. In the Senate, Rabain served as the Shadow Minister of Environment & Planning and was the Senate Spokesman for Public Works, Community/Cultural Development, and Education.

On February 4, 2016, Rabain was elected to the House of Assembly via a by-election to constituency 13, Devonshire North Central. On July 18, 2017, he was elected to the House of Assembly again for Constituency 13, Devonshire North Central and appointed to the Cabinet post of Minister of Education and Workforce Development by Premier of Bermuda, Edward David Burt.

Personal life 
Rabain attended Florida A&M University where he graduated in April 1995 with a degree in Electronic Engineering Technology.

He is a member of the Alpha Phi Alpha fraternity and currently serves as the International District Director for the East Region. He oversees Alpha chapters in Bermuda, London, Germany, Liberia, and South Africa.

References 

Bermudian politicians
Year of birth missing (living people)
Living people
Florida A&M University alumni
Members of the House of Assembly of Bermuda
Members of the Senate of Bermuda
Ministers of Education of Bermuda
Progressive Labour Party (Bermuda) politicians